As an adjective, obligate means "by necessity" (antonym facultative) and is used mainly in biology in phrases such as:
 Obligate aerobe, an organism that cannot survive without oxygen
 Obligate anaerobe, an organism that cannot survive in the presence of oxygen
 Obligate air-breather, a term used in fish physiology to describe those that respire entirely from the atmosphere
 Obligate biped, Bipedalism designed to walk on two legs
 Obligate carnivore, an organism dependent for survival on a diet of animal flesh.
 Obligate hibernation, a state of inactivity in which some organisms survive conditions of insufficiently available resources.
 Obligate intracellular parasite, a parasitic microorganism that cannot reproduce without entering a suitable host cell
 Obligate parasite, a parasite that cannot reproduce without exploiting a suitable host
 Obligate photoperiodic plant, a plant that requires sufficiently long or short nights before it initiates flowering, germination or similarly functions
 Obligate symbionts, organisms that can only live together in a symbiosis

See also
Opportunism (biological)

Biology terminology